The master plan of Jumeirah Garden City refers to the re-development of a  land area, conceptualized to be a part of the 2015 strategic plan for Dubai. The Jumeirah Garden City aims to cater to a population of 50,000 to 60,000 residents. The project will cost approximately Dh350 billion (approx. $95bn).
The announcement of the project coincided with the global financial crisis, and the construction of the project was put on hold due to global financial crisis.

Development

Jumeirah Garden City will be built over a period of 12 years, across an area north of Sheikh Zayed Road between Diyafa Street and Safa Park. Meraas Development has commissioned architect Adrian Smith of Adrian Smith + Gordon Gill Architecture to design four new projects as part of the Jumeirah Garden master plan.

The development will redefine living standards of the people living in neighborhoods of Dubai. One section will host Dubai Park, which will be half the size of Safa Park.

Construction phases

The first phase of Jumeirah Garden City will comprise six main blocks of high-, mid- and low-rise office, retail and residential buildings, two hotels and a high-end shopping area. Handover of phase one is expected to be start by the end of fourth quarter of 2011 and the whole phase will be fully ready in 2013. Jumeirah Garden City will also contain a huge park which will surround all the residential apartments, villas and other office and commercial buildings.
This development primarily consists of the re-development Satwa and Al-Wasl, with the inclusion of newly developed islands off the coastline of the primary land mass development. The developer Meraas was planning eight landmark buildings in Jumeirah Garden City, however, many such as 1 Dubai, 1 Park Avenue, and Meraas Tower were cancelled due to financial issues. The project also include Park gate which will comprise a complex of six buildings. The self-reclaimed artificial islands will be made up of east bay and coastal and will mainly entail the residences, but will also contain hotels and resorts.

Sustainability targets

Economically, sustainable practices help to shrink costs and will optimize the productivity of the individuals. On a smaller scale, adherents to sustainable building practices will find considerable improvements over the traditional building model with their structure’s long-term durability and reduced life cycle costs. In view of these positive impacts, it is clear that Eco-friendly buildings are of the utmost importance on both a local and a global scale. This precedent for sustainability is the impulsion behind the development of the Jumeirah Garden City.
This development has been envisioned to be a development representing the highest standards of sustainability and is expected to be a revolutionary example to the rest of Dubai, as well as the rest of the world.

Transportation
The districts will be linked to each other and to the rest of Dubai by a central canal, a network of public transport systems such as roads and boulevards, a light rail system as well as pedestrian walkways.

See also
List of tallest buildings in Dubai
Developments in Dubai
Sheikh Zayed Road
Porto Dubai
List of bridges and tunnels in Dubai

References

External links
Greentechno.ae
Dubaichronicle.com
xpress4me.com
Gulfnews.com
Estatesdubai.com

Buildings and structures under construction in Dubai